The Kik is a Dutch music group notable for paying homage to 1960s-era Beat music with Dutch lyrics ("Nederbeat"). They released their debut CD in May 2012 and quickly received national attention.

History
The group was founded in 2010 by Rotterdammer Dave von Raven (formerly of The Madd, a Nederbeat-inspired band with English lyrics), and released two singles in English in 2011 before switching to lyrics in Dutch in which, according to a critic for NU.nl, they combine camp with sincerity. They released their first album in 2012, Springlevend. A reviewer for de Volkskrant commented on the humorous and upbeat lyrics (mostly about girls), and singled out an adaptation of "Pleasant Valley Sunday", a hit for The Monkees in 1967. A reviewer for De Telegraaf said, "Their enthusiasm is contagious, their authentic-sounding Beatles-beats are fantastic."

The Kik were announced as the house band for the Dutch television show De Wereld Draait Door, for twelve episodes of the 2013 season; they performed on the show in May 2012 to promote Springlevend.

Members
Dave von Raven – guitar, vocals
Marcel Groenewegen – bass
Arjan Spies – guitar, vocals
Ries Doms – drums
Paul Zoontjens – keyboards, backing vocals

Discography
Springlevend (2012)
2 (2014)
Met De Deur in Huis (2015)
Armand & The Kik (2015)
Wij Zijn Vuilnisman (2016)
Stad en Land (2017)
Hertaalt! (2017)
Boudewijn de Groot's Voor de Overlevenden & Picknick (2019, live)
Jin (2020)

References

Musical groups from Rotterdam
Beat groups
Musical groups established in 2010
2010 establishments in the Netherlands